Minarni (later Minarni Soedaryanto; 10 May 1944 in Pasuruan, East Java – 14 May 2003 in Pertamina Central Hospital, South Jakarta) was an Indonesian badminton player who won major titles around the world and who represented her country internationally between 1959 and 1975. In 1968, Minarni became the first Indonesian to reach the final of women's singles at the All England Open, and with Retno Kustijah formed the first of only two Indonesian women's doubles teams yet to capture the All England Open title. She also won titles at the Indonesian National Championships, the quadrennial Asian Games, the Asian Championships, and at the Malaysia, U.S., Canada, Singapore, and New Zealand Opens. Minarni first played in the then triennial Uber Cup competition for Indonesia in her mid teens (1959). In her last Uber Cup campaign (1974-1975) her excellent doubles play helped Indonesia to win its first women's world team title.

10 May 2019, on what would have been her 75th birthday, she was honored with a Google Doodle.

Achievements

Asian Games 
Women's singles

Women's doubles

Mixed doubles

Asian Championships 
Women's singles

Women's doubles

International Open Tournaments (18 titles, 3 runners-up) 
Women's singles

Women's doubles

Mixed doubles

Invitational Tournament 
Women's doubles

Other Tournaments 

Women's singles

Women's doubles

References 

1944 births
2003 deaths
People from Pasuruan
Sportspeople from East Java
Indonesian female badminton players
Badminton players at the 1962 Asian Games
Badminton players at the 1966 Asian Games
Badminton players at the 1970 Asian Games
Badminton players at the 1974 Asian Games
Asian Games gold medalists for Indonesia
Asian Games silver medalists for Indonesia
Asian Games bronze medalists for Indonesia
Asian Games medalists in badminton
Medalists at the 1962 Asian Games
Medalists at the 1966 Asian Games
Medalists at the 1970 Asian Games
Medalists at the 1974 Asian Games